Barry Michael Popkin (born May 23, 1944) is an American nutrition and obesity researcher at the Carolina Population Center and the W.R. Kenan Jr. Distinguished Professor of Nutrition (as well as Carla Smith Chamblee Distinguished Professor of Global Nutrition) at the University of North Carolina at Chapel Hill School of Public Health, where he is the director of the Interdisciplinary Center for Obesity. He developed the concept of "nutrition transition". He is the author of over 490 journal articles and a book, "The World is Fat".

Early life and education
Popkin was born in 1944 and grew up in Superior, Wisconsin; neither of his parents had a college education. Popkin describes the food he ate in Superior as "...typical of the way most Americans handled food in the first half of the 20th century." He attended the University of Wisconsin, graduating in 1967. He spent the 1965-66 year in India living partly in a squatter area and partly at Delhi University. After which he spent one year doing graduate work at the University of Pennsylvania. In 1968, he returned to the University of Wisconsin, and received his MS from there one year later.  After a period of civil rights work, he worked at the University of Wisconsin Institute for Research on Poverty for a year and then in 1972 moved to Boston to work. Then he began to work at Cornell University in the fall of 1972 and began his thesis work in Jan 1973.  In July 1974, he received his PhD in agricultural economics from Cornell University.

Career
From 1971 to 1972 Popkin worked as a research economist at the Institute for Research in Poverty at the University of Wisconsin. From 1974 to 1976 Popkin was a visiting associate professor with the Rockefeller Foundation in Manila, Philippines. He joined UNC-Chapel Hill's faculty in 1977 and became the W.R. Kenan Jr. Distinguished Professor of Nutrition there in 2011.

Research
Popkin did extensive research from 1971 to the early 1980s on both hunger in America and around the world. He developed with Bob Evenson the Laguna Household Surveys and created the Bicol Multipurpose Survey while living in the Philippines and focused much of his attention there on women, work and the relationship of these activities to maternal and child health. He subsequently returned to the US and worked for a decade on maternal and child nutrition research, including initiating the Cebu Longitudinal Household Health and Nutrition Survey with two economics colleagues. He started the China Health and Nutrition Survey in the mid and late 1980s and it was out of this experience that he wrote a series of papers which created the concept of the nutrition transition. Much of his subsequent research globally has been on the transitions in the way we eat, drink and move and how the most recent stage of this transition has created in regions and countries throughout the globe many shifted toward increased obesity and related noncommunicable diseases and many adverse economic consequences. For many years he was writing and talking about this transition and it took a Bellagio conference he held in 2001 to convince leading scholars globally that low and middle income countries were going through this rapid shift toward a pattern of diet and activity linked with rapid shifts toward obesity.

He also was the first author to identify along with coauthor Colleen Doak the double burden of malnutrition in a series of papers first published in 2000. He also published papers linking obesity and stunting first and this led to many others studying both concepts.

He became very active in the obesity field.  He was a co-author on a widely cited 2004 paper in the American Journal of Clinical Nutrition which speculated that high fructose corn syrup-containing beverages may uniquely contribute to obesity. In his research, he shows how increasing access to media and exposure to advertising, a powerful food industry, the rise of Wal-Mart like shopping centers, and a dramatic decline in physical activity are clashing with millions of years of human evolution, creating a world of overweight people with debilitating health problems such as diabetes. Ultimately, Popkin contends that widespread obesity is less a result of poor individual dietary choices than about a hi-tech, interconnected world in which governments and multinational corporations have extraordinary power to shape our everyday lives. Popkin also conducted the China Health and Nutrition Survey, and has conducted other surveys in countries such as Russia, Kyrgyzstan, and the United Arab Emirates. He was a member of the G-7 small team of economists who worked in 1991 on working to help transform the Russia economy.  Then he helped to create a new poverty line for Russia and also initiated the ongoing Russian Longitudinal Monitoring Survey. Popkin was the chair of a committee of experts that published a report on the health effects of food deserts in 2009. They found that farmer's markets and supermarkets did not have a noticeable effect. He is currently leading a project whose goal is to determine the calorie and nutrient content of popular foods in the United States, or, as Popkin describes it, "mapping the food genome." In 2014, Popkin et al. published a study in which the authors reported that fast food consumption was not the sole contributor to childhood obesity, and that Western diets in general might be more strongly associated with obesity than fast food consumption alone. Regarding this study, Popkin told the Winston-Salem Chronicle that "Eating fast foods is just one behavior that results from those poor eating habits. Just because children who eat more fast food are the most likely to become obese does not prove that calories from fast foods bear the brunt of the blame." Another 2014 study led by Popkin found that as a result of the Healthy Weight Commitment Foundation Pledge, food companies sold about 6.4 trillion fewer calories in 2012 than they did in 2007.

More recently he worked with the Mexican government on a number of panels and commissions related to creating a healthier diet and preventing increased obesity and diabetes.  He is currently working with Mexican colleagues to evaluate rigorously the Mexican sugar-sweetened beverage and nonessential food taxes to learn how they impact food purchasing patterns and ultimately diet and health. He is working with a number of countries in Asia and Latin America on related large-scale activities to help reduce the risks of poor diets and obesity.

His Global Food Research Program at UNC has been done in collaboration with Professors Shu Wen Ng and Lindsey Smith Taillie.  Together they are working in a set of countries around the world in addition to Mexico on the design and evaluation and also research support for in-country research collaborators on policy advocacy. Those countries include Brazil, Colombia, South Africa, Jamaica and Barbados.

As part of an evaluation fund he leads, they are working with the Chilean government and colleagues at the Institute of Nutrition and Food Technology and the Chronicas group at the Universidad Peruana Cayetano Heredia in Lima.  A large series of papers are being published by both in evaluation their unique large-scale obesity prevention regulatory programs.

Nutrition transition

The concept of nutrition transition, referring to the changes in diet in the Western world from high-fiber diets to those based on more processed foods containing more fat and sugar, was first proposed by Popkin in 1993. Since he proposed the concept, Popkin has published studies about the nutrition transition and its effects in the developing world, as well as in Brazil.

Views
In 2013, Popkin argued that smoothies are "the new danger" due to the large quantities of fructose they contain. He is also a critic of the soft drink industry. He has expressed strong support for soda taxes, and has compared them to existing taxes on tobacco. When several large beverage companies promised to reduce soda consumption in 2014, Popkin said this was merely an attempt to pass off already declining soda sales as an effort to combat obesity.  In the past decade after he organized a bellagio conference on large-scale regulatory and fiscal options for addressing global obesity much of his energy has been working on regulatory options such as food labeling and marketing control in many countries(e.g. Chile), fiscal actions around SSB and other ultra-processed food taxes(e.g. Mexico), and consulting with dozens of countries on such actions.

The World is Fat
In 2009, Popkin's book The World is Fat was published by Avery Publishing. In the book, Popkin contends that the rising rates of obesity around the world are due to several different factors, including globalization, technology, and the fact that people now eat more often and in more places than they did before. He also cites the fact that humans have a tendency to enjoy eating foods containing large amounts of sugar and fat as another contributor to the obesity epidemic.

The book was described by Fuchsia Dunlop as "a concise, lucid overview of how the human diet has gone awry in the last half-century."

Personal life
Popkin was a partner of Anne-Linda Furstenberg, a former professor of social work at UNC-Chapel Hill for 16 years, until she died in 2002. With a previous wife he had a son, Matt.  He is currently a partner of Cay Stratton, formerly advisor to the UK government on youth and young adult employment and currently senior fellow at MDC, a nonprofit focusing on southern poverty issues.

References

External links
 Leading the War on Obesity, On Wisconsin Magazine
 Profile on Google Scholar

Living people
People from Superior, Wisconsin
Cornell University College of Agriculture and Life Sciences alumni
University of Wisconsin–Madison alumni
University of Wisconsin–Madison faculty
University of North Carolina at Chapel Hill faculty
1944 births
American epidemiologists
Obesity researchers
Economists from Wisconsin
21st-century American economists